Vivica or Vivika are female given names. Notable people with these names include:

Vivica Bandler (1917–2004), Finnish theater director
Vivica A. Fox (born 1964), US actress
Vivica Genaux (born 1969), US singer
Otto and Vivika Heino, US ceramicists

See also
Viveca
Ivica
VICA (disambiguation)
"Vivica", a song by Jack Off Jill from Clear Hearts Grey Flowers